Mangelia crebricostata is a species of sea snail, a marine gastropod mollusk in the family Mangeliidae.

Description
Compared with Oenopota aleutica (W.H. Dall, 1871), in Mangelia crebricostata the whorls are not so much angulated, the ribs pass from the suture to the lower end of the whorl, and the aperture is narrower and longer. The shell is also much more slender and smaller.

Distribution
This marine species occurs from Forrester Island, Alaska, and Vancouver Island, Canada, to Monterey, California, United States.

References

External links
  Tucker, J.K. 2004 Catalog of recent and fossil turrids (Mollusca: Gastropoda). Zootaxa 682:1–1295.

crebricostata
Gastropods described in 1864
Taxa named by Philip Pearsall Carpenter